The 2019–20 Borussia Dortmund season was the 111th season in the football club's history and 44th consecutive and 53rd overall season in the top flight of German football, the Bundesliga, having been promoted from the 2. Bundesliga Nord in 1976.

In addition to the domestic league, Borussia Dortmund also participated in the season's editions of the domestic cup, the DFB-Pokal, and the first-tier continental cup, the UEFA Champions League. This was the 46th season for Dortmund in the Signal Iduna Park, located in Dortmund, North Rhine-Westphalia, Germany. The season covered a period from 1 July 2019 to 30 June 2020.

Transfers

Transfers in

Loans in

Transfers out

Loans out

Players

Kits
Supplier: Puma /
Sponsor: Evonik Industries

Friendly matches

Competitions

Overview

Bundesliga

League table

Results summary

Results by round

Matches
The Bundesliga schedule was announced on 28 June 2019.

DFB-Pokal

DFL-Supercup

UEFA Champions League

Group stage

Knockout phase

Round of 16

Statistics

Appearances and goals

|-
! colspan=16 style=background:#dcdcdc; text-align:center| Goalkeepers

|-
! colspan=16 style=background:#dcdcdc; text-align:center| Defenders

|-
! colspan=16 style=background:#dcdcdc; text-align:center| Midfielders

|-
! colspan=16 style=background:#dcdcdc; text-align:center| Forwards

|-
! colspan=16 style=background:#dcdcdc; text-align:center| Players transferred out during the season

Notes

Goalscorers

Last updated: 20 June 2020

References

Borussia Dortmund seasons
Dortmund
Borussia Dortmund